The Baum Bugle: A Journal of Oz is the official journal of The International Wizard of Oz Club. The journal was founded in 1957, with its first issue released in June of that year (to a subscribers' list of sixteen). It publishes three times per year, with issues dated Spring, Autumn, and Winter; Issue No. 1 of Volume 50 appeared in the Spring of 2006. The journal publishes both scholarly and popular articles on L. Frank Baum, the Oz books written by Baum and other writers, and related subjects, plus reviews of Oz-related films and theater productions, rare photographs and illustrations, and similar materials.

Among the range of articles and fiction published in The Baum Bugle:
 Baum's "A Kidnapped Santa Claus", Winter 1968
"The Tiger's Eye: A Jungle Fairy Tale", a rare Baum short story, Spring 1979
"Dorothy Gage and Dorothy Gale", by Sally Roesch Wagner, discussing the familial connection between the Baums and the name Dorothy, Autumn 1984
"Bibliographia Baumiana: The Sea Fairies", by Patrick M. Maund, Spring 1997
"Bibliographia Baumiana: The Enchanted Island of Yew", by Patrick M. Maund and Peter E. Hanff, Spring 1998
"Triumph and Tragedy on the Yellow Brick Road: Censorship of The Wizard of Oz in America", by Hana S. Field, Spring 2000.
"Adventures in Oz" Vacationing in the Land of Oz Over the Rainbow to Beech Mountain, North Carolina by Gregory Hugh Leng, Spring 2011.

References
 Bracken, James K. Reference Works in British and American Literature. Second edition; Englewood, CO, Libraries Unlimited, 1998.
 Clark, Beverly Lyon. Kiddie Lit: The Cultural Construction of Children's Literature in America. Baltimore, Johns Hopkins University Press, 2003.
Multiple Authors. The Best of the Baum Bugle. The International Wizard of Oz Club; published biennially.
Otto, Frederick E. Index to the Baum Bugle. The International Wizard of Oz Club, 1990. Revised and expanded by Richard R. Rutter, 2002.
 Rogers, Katharine M. L. Frank Baum: Creator of Oz. New York, St. Martin's Press, 2002.

External links
 On The Baum Bugle

 

Fanzines
Publications established in 1957
Oz studies
L. Frank Baum